The Cal State Bakersfield baseball team represents California State University, Bakersfield in the NCAA Division I college baseball. Cal State Bakersfield plays its home games on Hardt Field on the campus of California State University, Bakersfield in Bakersfield, California. The Roadrunners have played in one NCAA Tournament. Over their eight seasons in the Western Athletic Conference, they have won one WAC regular season title and one WAC tournament. The Roadrunners compete in the Big West Conference and are led by head coach Jeremy Beard.

Since the program's inception in 2009, two Roadrunners have gone on to play in Major League Baseball, relief pitcher Austin Davis, and knuckleball pitcher Mickey Jannis. Over the program's 12 seasons, 20 Roadrunners have been drafted, including Darius Vines who was selected in the seventh round of the 2019.

Conference membership history 
2009–2012: Independent
2013–2020: Western Athletic Conference
2021–present: Big West Conference

Hardt Field 

Hardt Field is a baseball stadium on the California State University, Bakersfield campus in Bakersfield, California that seats 900 people. It was opened on February 20, 2009 in a 7–8 loss to Saint Louis.

Head coaches 
Records taken from the CSUB coaching records.

Year-by-year results
Records taken from the CSUB year-by-year results.

NCAA Division I tournament history
The NCAA Division I baseball tournament started in 1947.
The format of the tournament has changed through the years.
Cal State Bakersfield began playing baseball in 2009.

Awards and honors

 Over their 12 seasons in Division I, one Roadrunner has been named to an NCAA-recognized All-America team.
 Over their 8 seasons in the Western Athletic Conference, 13 different Roadrunners have been named to the all-conference first-team.

All-Americans

Freshman First-Team All-Americans

Western Athletic Conference Coach of the Year

Western Athletic Conference Player of the Year

Western Athletic Conference Pitcher of the Year

Taken from CSUB baseball national recognition and conference recognition pages. Updated March 19, 2020.

Roadrunners in the Major Leagues

Taken from Baseball Reference. Updated June 25, 2021.

See also
List of NCAA Division I baseball programs

References

External links